The 2005 Northern Illinois Huskies football team represented Northern Illinois University as a member of the West Division of the Mid-American Conference (MAC) during the 2005 NCAA Division I-A football season. Led by tenth-year head coach Joe Novak, the Huskies compiled an overall record of 7–5 with a mark of 6–2 in conference play, sharing the MAC's West Division title with Toledo. By virtue of their head-to-head win over Toledo, Northern Illinois advanced to the MAC Championship Game, where they lost to Akron. Despite reaching bowl eligibility, the Huskies were not invited to a bowl game. The team played home games at Huskie Stadium in DeKalb, Illinois.

Schedule

References

Northern Illinois
Northern Illinois Huskies football seasons
Northern Illinois Huskies football